Lily of Killarney may refer to:

 The Lily of Killarney, an 1829 opera by the Anglo-German composer Julius Benedict
 Lily of Killarney (1929 film), a British film directed by George Ridgwell
 Lily of Killarney (1934 film), a British film directed by Maurice Elvey